Greg Wilson (born 22 August 1972) is a Saint Lucian cricketer. He played in four first-class and two List A matches for the Windward Islands in 2000/01 and 2001/02.

See also
 List of Windward Islands first-class cricketers

References

External links
 

1972 births
Living people
Saint Lucian cricketers
Windward Islands cricketers